Babcock Scandinavian AirAmbulance is a Swedish helicopter and fixed-wing airline that operates primarily air ambulance helicopters and planes for the Swedish, Finnish and Norwegian governments.

The airline operates 18 helicopters and 9 fixed-wing aircraft and has headquarters in Stockholm Arlanda Airport, Sweden.

Fleet
As of October 2019 the Babcock Scandinavian AirAmbulance fleet includes:

 8 Beech King Air B200
 6 AgustaWestland AW169
 6 Airbus Helicopters H145
 5 Airbus Helicopters AS365 Dauphin
 1 Airbus Helicopters H135
 1 Learjet 35A

References

External links

  

Airlines of Sweden
Helicopter airlines
Air ambulance services in Sweden
Companies based in Stockholm County